The Ezra Jack Keats Book Award is an annual U.S. literary award.

At the Ezra Jack Keats Book Awards Ceremony every April, the Ezra Jack Keats Foundation presents the New Writer Award (since 1985) and New Illustrator Award (since 2001) to an author and an illustrator who are at an early stage of their career. An Honor Books category was added in 2012.

The nonprofit Ezra Jack Keats Foundation was established in 1964 in Brooklyn, New York by author and illustrator Ezra Jack Keats.  

Until 2011, the Award was presented jointly with the New York Public Library. Since 2012, it is co-presented with the de Grummond Children’s Literature Collection at the University of Southern Mississippi, in Hattiesburg. 

Award winners include Stian Hole, Garmann's Summer in 2009, Meg Medina, Tía Isa Wants a Car in 2012 and Don Tate, The Remarkable Story of George Moses Horton in 2016.

Winner

See also

References

External links 

 Official website

Awards established in 1985
Awards established in 2001
1985 establishments in the United States
Children's literary awards
English-language literary awards